Katarina Marinkovikj (born 6 May 1999) is a Macedonian tennis player.

On the juniors tour, Marinkovikj has a career high ITF junior combined ranking of 686, achieved on 2 January 2017.
On the juniors tour, Marinkovic has a career high Tennis Europe junior of 13 in Europe U16.
She started studying at George Washington University, in 2018. In 2020 she was the number 1 player for both singles and doubles after winning the Rookie of the Year award in 2019 at GWU.

ITF junior finals

Singles (0–1)

Doubles (2–1)

National representation

Fed Cup
Marinkovikj made her Fed Cup debut for Macedonia in 2015, while the team was competing in the Europe/Africa Zone Group III, when she was 15 years and 345 days old. 
She represented her country on 4 Fed Cup Competitions, playing on position number 1 the last two years.

Fed Cup (9–10)

Singles (3–7)

Doubles (6–3)

References

External links
 
 
 

1999 births
Living people
Macedonian female tennis players
Sportspeople from Skopje
George Washington Colonials athletes
College women's tennis players in the United States